

Politics and government

Heads of state and government
Four Presidents of the United States have had connections to Princeton. Princeton alumni and former students have served as heads of government in Bangladesh, Belgium, Peru, Senegal, and South Korea.

Vice presidents
Three Vice Presidents of the United States and one Vice-President of Kenya have attended Princeton.

Cabinet members and senior ministers
This lists Cabinet members and other senior ministers to national governments. Most associated with Princeton have been members of the Cabinet of the United States, but Princetonians have also served in the Cabinets of Canada, Colombia, Costa Rica, Germany, Greece, Haiti, Mexico, the Netherlands, Saudi Arabia, South Africa, and Turkey. John C. Breckinridge served in the Cabinet of the Confederate States of America, the nation proclaimed by the rebelling Southern states during the American Civil War.

Central bankers
This is a list of people associated with Princeton who have held senior positions within central banks. Several Princetonians have held senior positions within the Federal Reserve System, the central bank of the United States; two (Ben Bernanke and Paul Volcker) have served as Chairman. Another, Nicholas Biddle, served as President of the Second Bank of the United States. Several have served in non-U.S. central banks, as well.

State and provincial governors
The Governor of New Jersey is an ex officio Trustee of the University. Only Governors with another connection to Princeton are included in this list. Princetonians have served as governors of 23 of the 50 U.S. states.

In the "Notes" column, Governors of U.S. states who also served in Congress represented the same states they governed unless otherwise specified.

Continental Congress

Constitutional Convention

Senate

House of Representatives

U.S. Supreme Court

Other
This section lists people not listed in prior sections. It includes members of legislatures other than the U.S. Congress, judges and other legal officials, diplomats, sub-Cabinet officials, activists, royalty, and other figures in politics and government.

References 

 
People